Xiaozhai station is a station on Line 2 and Line 3 of the Xi'an Metro. It is one of the busiest metro stations in Xi'an. It began operations on 16 September 2011.

References

Railway stations in Shaanxi
Railway stations in China opened in 2011
Xi'an Metro stations